Glipa ohgushii is a species of beetle in the genus Glipa. It was described in 1962.

References

ohgushii
Beetles described in 1962